Jan Rytter (born 5 September 1973) is a Danish archer. He competed in the men's individual and team events at the 1992 Summer Olympics.

References

1973 births
Living people
Danish male archers
Olympic archers of Denmark
Archers at the 1992 Summer Olympics
Sportspeople from Aalborg
20th-century Danish people